Anamudi Shola National Park is a protected area located along the Western Ghats of Idukki district in Kerala state, India. It is composed of Mannavan shola, Idivara shola and Pullardi shola, covering a total area of around 7.5 km². Draft notification of this new park was released on 21 November 2003.

The park is administered by Munnar Wildlife Division, together with the nearby Mathikettan Shola National Park, Eravikulam National Park, Pampadum Shola National Park, Chinnar Wildlife Sanctuary and the Kurinjimala Sanctuary. 
The Western Ghats, Anamalai Sub-Cluster, including all of Eravikulam National Park, is under consideration by the UNESCO World Heritage Committee for selection as a World Heritage Site.

Geography
Elevation ranges from  - . Anamudi Shola National Park provides wildlife habitat connectivity between Mathikettan Shola National Park, Eravikulam National Park, Pampadum Shola National Park, Chinnar Wildlife Sanctuary and the Kurinjimala Sanctuary, all of which surround this protected area. This national park forms part of the Anamalai sub-cluster, which was recently nominated for consideration for World Heritage Site status under UNESCO's World Heritage Programme.

Fauna 
The national park is a home for large number of faunal and floral species. The park consists of some of the rarest types of plants and species which are not found anywhere else.

The park provides safe and comfortable habitat to these wild species of flora and fauna. The rich wildlife includes Elephant, Tiger, Nilgiri tahr, Gaur, Spotted Deer, Sambar, Grizzled Giant Squirrel, Hanuman Langur, Sloth Bear, Flying Squirrels etc

References

External links
 http://circle.forest.kerala.gov.in/wckottayam/index.php?option=com_content&view=article&id=106&Itemid=82

National parks in Kerala
Tourist attractions in Idukki district
Geography of Idukki district
2003 establishments in Kerala
Protected areas established in 2003